Österstad is a locality situated in Motala Municipality, Östergötland County, Sweden with 318 inhabitants in 2010.

References 

Populated places in Östergötland County
Populated places in Motala Municipality